Juliano Laurentino dos Santos (born 16 February 1985 in João Pessoa), commonly known as Roma, is a Brazilian footballer who currently plays for América Futebol Clube (PE) as a winger.

External links
 

1985 births
Living people
People from João Pessoa, Paraíba
Association football midfielders
Brazilian footballers
Brazilian expatriate footballers
Centro Sportivo Alagoano players
Sport Club do Recife players
S.C. Beira-Mar players
Expatriate footballers in Portugal
Foolad FC players
Expatriate footballers in Iran
Doxa Katokopias FC players
Cypriot First Division players
Expatriate footballers in Cyprus
S.C. Covilhã players
Central Sport Club players
Campinense Clube players
América Futebol Clube (PE) players
Sportspeople from Paraíba